Warp Drive Inc is an American manufacturer of composite propellers for ultralight aircraft, ultralight trikes, light-sport aircraft, amateur-built aircraft, gyrocopter, airboats and other non-certified applications. The company is based in Ventura, Iowa.

The company makes its propellers from solid carbon-fiber-reinforced polymer.

See also
List of aircraft propeller manufacturers

References

External links 

Aircraft propeller manufacturers
Aerospace companies of the United States